Kedgeree (or occasionally ) is a dish consisting of cooked, flaked fish (traditionally smoked haddock), boiled rice, parsley, hard-boiled eggs, curry powder, butter or cream, and occasionally sultanas.

The dish can be eaten hot or cold. Other fish can be used instead of haddock such as tuna or salmon, though these are not traditional.

In India, khichari is any of a large variety of legume-and-rice dishes. These dishes are made with a spice mixture designed for each recipe and either dry-toasted or fried in oil before inclusion. This dish was heavily adapted by the British, resulting in a dish almost unrecognisably different from the original khichari.

History
Kedgeree is thought to have originated with the Indian rice-and-bean or rice-and-lentil dish khichuṛī, traced back to 1340 or earlier. Hobson-Jobson cites ibn Battuta mentioning a dish of munj (mung beans) boiled with rice called kishrī and cites a recipe for khichdi from the Ain-i-Akbari. In Gujarat, where khichdi remains popular, the lentil and rice dish is usually served with kadhi, a spiced yogurt dish that can be mixed with the khichdi. Khichdi is usually not prepared with fish in Gujarat, although fish is sometimes eaten with khichdi in coastal villages where seafood is plentiful. According to Hobson-Jobson, while fish is eaten with kedgeree, the use of the term for "mess of re-cooked fish ... is inaccurate".

The Mughal emperor Aurangzeb (d.1707) was fond of the Alamgiri Khichdi, a variety featuring fish and boiled eggs. It is widely believed that the dish was brought to the United Kingdom by returning British colonials who had enjoyed it in India and introduced it to the UK as a breakfast dish in Victorian times, part of the fashionable Anglo-Indian cuisine. The dish was listed as early as 1790 in the recipe book of Stephana Malcolm of Burnfoot, Dumfriesshire. The National Trust for Scotland's book The Scottish Kitchen by Christopher Trotter notes the Malcolm recipe and other old examples, expressing the belief that the dish was devised by Scottish regiments hankering for the tastes of India. By the 19th century, Kedgeree had become a sophisticated breakfast/brunch dish in England, appearing, for example, in a Saki short story.

See also
 Koshary, a related Egyptian dish
 List of seafood dishes
 List of rice dishes

References

External links 

 

Fish dishes
Indian cuisine in the United Kingdom
Indian rice dishes
Victorian cuisine
Anglo-Indian cuisine
Curry dishes